Priest River Lamanna High School is a high school in Priest River, Idaho.

Its former building, currently used by Priest River Junior High School, was added to the National Register of Historic Places in 1995.

References

External links

Public high schools in Idaho
Schools in Bonner County, Idaho